Henry Te Reiwhati Vercoe  (1884–1962) was a notable New Zealand horseman, soldier, farmer and community leader. Of Māori descent, he identified with the Ngāti Pikiao and Ngāti Tuara iwi, part of the Te Arawa confederation. He was born in Maketu, Bay of Plenty, New Zealand in 1884.

In the 1953 Coronation Honours, Vercoe was appointed an Officer of the Order of the British Empire.

References

1884 births
1962 deaths
New Zealand military personnel
New Zealand farmers
People from Maketu
New Zealand Māori soldiers
Ngāti Pikiao people
Te Arawa people
New Zealand Officers of the Order of the British Empire
New Zealand Companions of the Distinguished Service Order
New Zealand recipients of the Distinguished Conduct Medal